Gazar (also Romanized as Gāzār) is a village in Shakhenat Rural District of Shakhenat District, Birjand County, South Khorasan province, Iran, and serves as capital of the district. At the 2006 National Census, its population was 520 in 207 households, when it was in the Central District). The following census in 2011 counted 669 people in 200 households. The latest census in 2016 showed a population of 622 people in 224 households. After the census, Shakhen Rural District and Shakhenat Rural District were separated from the Central District to establish Shakhenat District, with Gazar as its capital.

References 

Birjand County

Populated places in South Khorasan Province

Populated places in Birjand County